This Old House is an American home improvement media brand with television shows, a magazine and a website, ThisOldHouse.com. The brand is headquartered in Stamford, CT. The television series airs on the American television station Public Broadcasting Service (PBS) and follows remodeling projects of houses over a number of weeks.

Note: Episodes are listed in the original broadcast order

Season 31 (2009–2010)
Kevin O'Connor's seventh season as the host.

Season 32 (2010–11)
Kevin O'Connor's eighth season as the host.

Season 33 (2011–12)
Kevin O'Connor's ninth season as the host.

Season 34 (2012–13)
Kevin O'Connor's tenth season as the host.
Beginning with this season, This Old House introduced its current theme song, composed by Bill Janovitz.

Season 35 (2013–14)
Kevin O'Connor's eleventh season as the host, and This Old House celebrates its 35th anniversary.

Season 36 (2014–15)
Kevin O'Connor's twelfth season as the host.

Season 37 (2015–16)
Kevin O'Connor's thirteenth season as the host.

Season 38 (2016–17)
Kevin O'Connor's fourteenth season as the host.

Season 39 (2017–18)
Kevin O'Connor's fifteenth season as the host.

Season 40 (2018–19)
Kevin O'Connor's sixteenth season as the host, and This Old House celebrates its 40th anniversary.
This is the last season to be produced by WGBH-TV in Boston, who had been produced since This Old House debuted in 1979.

References

External links

This Old House at cptv.org

This Old House